Johan Fritzner (9 April 1812 - 10 December 1893) was a Norwegian priest and lexicographer. He is known for his magnum opus Ordbog over det gamle norske Sprog, a major dictionary of Old Norse vocabulary.

References 

Norwegian lexicographers
1812 births
1893 deaths
19th-century lexicographers